Kastl is a municipality in the district of Altötting in Bavaria in Germany. It is the result of a merger of Oberkastl, Unterkastl and Forstkastl in the 1960s.

References

Altötting (district)